Music for Artificial Clouds is an experimental instrumental album by The Young Gods.

Track listing
 "Eregeen" - 6:40
 "Oxiam" - 6:11
 "Arcia" - 6:19
 "Ophiushi" - 4:42
 "Pompom Girl" - 6:16
 "Iwasi" - 5:27
 "Tangram" - 4:20
 "Dew Point Five" - 8:13
 "Double Moon" - 4:30
 "Paucari" - 8:29
 "Magnetosphere" - 4:27
 "Sandvaten" - 4:46

Personnel
 Glenn Miller - Mastering
 Alain Monod - Keyboards
 Franz Treichler - Vocals
 Bernard Trontin - Drums

The Young Gods albums
2000 albums
Ipecac Recordings albums
Albums produced by Roli Mosimann